Comitas kirai is a species of sea snail, a marine gastropod mollusc in the family Pseudomelatomidae, the turrids and allies.

Description
The length of the shell varies between 20 mm and 30 mm.

Distribution
This marine species occurs off the Philippines, Japan and in the South China Sea.

References

  Powell, A.W.B. 1969. The family Turridae in the Indo-Pacific. Part. 2. The subfamily Turriculinae. Indo-Pacific Mollusca 2(10): 207–415, pls 188–324

External links
 
 

kirai
Gastropods described in 1969